David Weston may refer to:

 David Weston (actor) (born 1938), English actor, director and author
 David Weston (artist) (1935–2011), British industrial artist and author
 David Weston (cricketer) (1930–1977), New Zealand cricketer
 David E. Weston (1929–2001), English acoustician
 David John Weston (1898–?), World War I flying ace